Sŏsŏng-guyŏk, or Sosong District, is one of the 18 guyŏk of Pyongyang, North Korea.  It is located on the Pot'ong River, west of the Moranbong-guyŏk (Moranbong District) and south of Hyŏngjesan-guyŏk (Hyongjesan District).  It was established January 1958.

Administrative divisions
Sŏsŏng-guyŏk is divided into thirteen administrative districts known as dong. Two neighborhoods (Changgyong and Sosan) are further divided in two parts for administrative purposes.

References

Districts of Pyongyang